Loveday King (née Carter, born 8 September 1935) is a retired English darts player.

Personal life
King was born Loveday Carter to parents John and Vivienne. She married Tommy King, and they had two daughters, Patricia and Lorraine, and one son named Mark.

Career
King won the inaugural Indoor League ladies' Darts championship in 1973, defeating Jessie Catterick 2–0 in the final. This was the first ever televised women's darts tournament. Later, she continued to play county Darts for Cornwall from 1974 until 1990.

King went on to win the BDO Gold Cup in 1981, defeating Jean Smith 3–2 in the final, having beaten tournament favourite Maureen Flowers en route. She also played in the World Masters in the early 1980s.

References

Sportspeople from Cornwall
1935 births
Living people
English darts players
British Darts Organisation players
Female darts players
People from Lanivet